"The Anthem" is a song by American rock band Good Charlotte from their studio album, The Young and the Hopeless (2002). Members Joel Madden and Benji Madden originally wrote the song for a film soundtrack alongside John Feldmann, but it did not appear in the film. According to Joel Madden, the song is about "not living the way that you're supposed to live", and Benji Madden added that the song is about achieving one's goals.

"The Anthem" was released on January 13, 2003, as the second single from The Young and the Hopeless and charted in several countries, peaking at number 10 on the UK Singles Chart and number 43 on the US Billboard Hot 100. The song has received gold certifications in Australia, the United Kingdom, and the United States. The second disc of the UK CD single features a live cover of the song "Acquiesce" by Britpop band Oasis.

Background and composition
When lead vocalist Joel Madden was 19, he went out to Los Angeles for the first time and met up with producer John Feldmann, and they went surfing together. Feldmann told Joel that a movie was looking for a soundtrack song, and Joel wrote an appropriate one with his brother Benji Madden and Feldmann that turned into "The Anthem". The movie ended up not wanting the song, but it became a charting hit for the band in several countries when they released it. Despite the title, Joel said, "I honestly didn't think 'The Anthem' would even be a big song."

In 2003, Joel described the lyrics:

"To us," added guitarist Billy Martin in the same interview, "it's a song saying that whatever goal you have, try and reach it." Composed in the key of D major, "The Anthem" is written in common time with a driving rock tempo.

Release and reception
"The Anthem" was serviced to American alternative radio on January 13, 2003, and peaked at number 10 on the Billboard Modern Rock Tracks chart in late March 2003. The song then crossed over to contemporary hit radio, to which the song was released on March 3, 2003. Appearing as the Billboard Hot 100's "Hot Shot Debut" at number 56 later the same month, "The Anthem" took three more weeks to peak at number 43 on the listing, becoming Good Charlotte's second top-50 hit in the US. The song also charted on the Billboard Mainstream Top 40, where it reached number 11 in May 2003. On December 12, 2005, the song received a gold certification from the Recording Industry Association of America (RIAA) for selling over 500,000 digital copies in the US.

"The Anthem" was released in Australia as a CD single on March 3, 2003. The following week, the song debuted at number 14, its peak, on the ARIA Singles Chart and spent a second week at number 14 in April 2003 before descending the chart, totaling 18 weeks in the top 50. The Australian Recording Industry Association (ARIA) awarded the song a gold disc in 2003 for shipping over 35,000 copies in Australia. In New Zealand, the song first appeared on the RIANZ Singles Chart on March 16, 2003, and climbed to number 27 two weeks later, spending seven weeks on the chart. The track was released in the United Kingdom on August 18, 2003, when it debuted and peaked at number 10 on the UK Singles Chart to become Good Charlotte's third top-10 hit in the UK, and it was certified gold by the British Phonographic Industry (BPI) in 2021 for sales and streams exceeding 400,000 units. Elsewhere in Europe, the song reached number 28 in Sweden, number 34 in Ireland, and number 52 in Germany.

Variety ranked it as one of the best emo songs of all time in 2022.

Track listings

US CD single
 "The Anthem"
 "Lifestyles of the Rich and Famous"

UK CD1
 "The Anthem" – 2:55
 "If You Leave" – 2:43
 "The Motivation Proclamation" (live acoustic) – 3:42
 "The Anthem" (video) – 2:55

UK CD2
 "The Anthem" – 2:55
 "Acquiesce" (live on BBC 3) – 3:50
 "Complicated" – 2:49

European CD single
 "The Anthem" – 2:55
 "If You Leave" – 2:43

Australian CD single
 "The Anthem" – 2:55
 "Riot Girl" (acoustic version) – 2:22
 "The Young and the Hopeless" (acoustic version) – 3:34
 "Lifestyles of the Rich and Famous" (acoustic version) – 3:23

Credits and personnel
Credits are adapted from the UK CD1 liner and disc notes.

Studio
 Recorded at Barefoot Studios (Los Angeles)

Personnel

 Benji Madden – writing
 Joel Madden – writing
 John Feldmann – writing

 Eric Valentine – production, engineering, mixing
 Ken Allardyce – engineering
 Brian "Big Bass" Gardner – mastering

Charts

Weekly charts

Year-end charts

Certifications

Release history

References

2002 songs
2003 singles
Daylight Records singles
Epic Records singles
Good Charlotte songs
Song recordings produced by Eric Valentine
Songs written by Benji Madden
Songs written by Joel Madden